Brighton is an unincorporated community in Greenfield Township, LaGrange County, Indiana.

History
Brighton was originally called Lexington, and under the latter name was laid out in 1836. A post office called Brighton was established in 1837, and remained in operation until it was discontinued in 1911.

Geography

References

Unincorporated communities in LaGrange County, Indiana
Unincorporated communities in Indiana